Før var det morsomt med sne is the second studio album by Norwegian rock band deLillos. It was re-released in 2005 as a double-disc Deluxe Edition including part two of Kjerringvikdemoen.

Track listing
"Nei ikke gjør det"
"Vil ikke sove"
"Eventyr"
"Arne"
"Bankran"
"Hun har gått seg vill"
"Stole på"
"S'il vous plait"
"Jeg vet nok ikke"
"For første gang"
"Avismannen"
"Forelsket"
"Anonym (vil være blid)"
"Racerbåt"

Deluxe Edition also includes the following tracks from Kjerringvikdemoen :

"Kunstig og kulørt"
"Avismannen"
"Racerbåt"
"Venter på telefon"
"Vil ikke sove"
"Jeg vet nok ikke"
"Forelsket"
"Eventyr"
"S'il vous plait"
"Hun har gått seg vill"
"Skulle bare være morsom"
"Together with my"

1987 albums
DeLillos albums
Sonet Records albums